Spencer Bridges may refer to:

Spencir Bridges, an actor in the film Daddy Day Camp
Spencer Bridges, the secret identity of the Image Comics character Myriad